The 2002–03 season was Hartlepool United's 96th year in existence. Along with competing in Division Three, the club also participated in the FA Cup, League Cup and League Trophy. The season covers the period from 1 July 2002 to 30 June 2003.

Players

Current squad

Results

Pre-season friendlies

Division Three

Results summary

Results by matchday

Results

FA Cup

League Cup

Football League Trophy

Squad statistics

Appearances and goals

|}

Goalscorers

Clean Sheets

Penalties

References

Hartlepool United
Hartlepool United F.C. seasons
2000s in County Durham